McSorley Hill (also: Bush Street Ski Jump) was a K30 ski jumping hill located in Red Wing, Minnesota, United States, opened in 1887.

History 
On 8 February 1887, a ski jumping hill owned by Aurora Ski Club opened with ski jumping competition often cited as first ever on US soil. Mikkjel Hemmestveit set the first ever American record at 37 feet (11.3 metres). 

Two official world records in ski jumping were set on this hill. In 1891 Mikkjel Hemmestveit set a record at 102 feet (31.1 metres) and two years later was improved by Torjus Hemmestveit to 102.5 feet (31.4 metres).

On 17 February 1894, Torjus Hemmestveit made a world record distance jump at 120 feet (36.6 metres), but he fell and it didn't count as a record.

Ski jumping world records 

 Not recognized! Crash at world record distance.

References

External links
McSorley Hill skisprungschanzen.com

Red Wing, Minnesota
Ski jumping venues in the United States
Landforms of Goodhue County, Minnesota